Dmitri Zyuzin (born October 21, 1987) is a professional ice hockey player who currently plays the 2010–11 season in the Kontinental Hockey League with Metallurg Novokuznetsk.

References

External links

1987 births
Living people
Metallurg Novokuznetsk players
Russian ice hockey centres
Sportspeople from Ufa